Stephanie Gaitley (née Vanderslice; born January 25, 1960) is a former American basketball coach. She has served as head basketball coach at Fordham University, Monmouth University, and Long Island University. During her six seasons at LIU, she posted a 95–82 record. In 2007, she guided LIU to a school record 22 wins, and the top overall seed in the NEC tournament. She was named the 2006-07 NEC coach of the year for her efforts. She led LIU to two 20+ win seasons, and the first WNIT appearance in school history.

She also served as the head basketball coach at Saint Joseph's University in Philadelphia. She led the Hawks to five 20 win seasons, and two Atlantic 10 championships, as well as five NCAA tournament appearances. She also coached at the University of Richmond from 1985 to 1991. She compiled a 116–63 record, and led the Spiders to two CAA championships, as well as 2 tournament bids. She was named CAA coach of the year in 1990.

Gaitley was raised in Ocean City, New Jersey.

USA Basketball
Gaitley was named an assistant coach of the team representing the US in 2000 at the William Jones Cup competition in Taipei, Taiwan. The USA team started strong with a 32-point win over the host team, the Republic of China National Team. They then beat South Korea easily and faced Japan in the third game. Japan started out strongly, and had an 18-point lead in the first half. The USA then out scored Japan 23–3 to take a small lead at the half. The USA built a ten-point lead, but Japan cut it back to three with under a minute to go. Kelly Schumacher grabbed an offensive rebound and scored to bring the lead back to five points and the team held on for the win. Schumacher had 24 points to help the USA team beat Japan 83–80. The final game was against Malaysia, but it wasn't close, with the USA winning 79–24, to secure a 4–0 record for the competition and the gold medal.

Head coaching career
Sources:

 CAA record book
 A10 Media Guide
 Northeast Conference Record book
 2002-03 NEC Standings
 A10 Standings

See also
 List of college women's basketball coaches with 600 wins

References

External links
 Stephanie Gaitley profile

1960 births
Living people
American women's basketball coaches
Basketball coaches from New Jersey
Basketball players from New Jersey
Fordham Rams women's basketball coaches
LIU Brooklyn Blackbirds women's basketball coaches
Monmouth Hawks women's basketball coaches
People from Ocean City, New Jersey
Richmond Spiders women's basketball coaches
Saint Joseph's Hawks women's basketball coaches
Sportspeople from Cape May County, New Jersey
Villanova Wildcats women's basketball players